Williams Holdings was a major British conglomerate. It was listed on the London Stock Exchange, and was a constituent of the FTSE 100 Index.

History
The company was established by Nigel Rudd and Brian McGowan in Derby in 1982 to acquire under performing businesses. Its first major acquisition was J & HB Jackson, a Coventry based metal business, in 1985. The company went to acquire Crown Berger, a paints business, in 1987, Pilgrim House in the United States (owners of Kidde) for £331m in 1988 and Yale & Valor, a locks and gas fires business, in 1991.

In 1988, Williams Holdings acquired Berger, Jenson and Nicholson Ltd from Hoechst AG.

It started to focus on security in the 1990s, selling its paints business to Akzo Nobel in 1990. In February 1997, it bought Chubb Security for $US2.1 billion. It changed its name to Williams plc in 1998 and sold Yale Lock Company to Assa Abloy in March 2000.

Demerging
The company demerged into Chubb and Kidde in July 2000.

References

External links

Conglomerate companies established in 1982
Companies formerly listed on the London Stock Exchange
Companies based in Derbyshire
Conglomerate companies of the United Kingdom
1982 establishments in the United Kingdom